The National Hoover for President League was established in the United States in 1928 and existed through the 1930s.

The league was established in 1928 by the Republican National Committee. Soon after its creation it was disavowed by the Republican National Committee and investigated by United States Postal Inspection Service and a federal grand jury.

Divisions 

 Hoover Business League
 Hoover Air League, run by Don Ryan Mockler and Eddie August Schneider

References

1928 establishments in the United States
Republican Party (United States) organizations
Organizations established in 1928